William R. Dunn (May 23, 1888 – March 24, 1946) was an American actor on film and stage and in vaudeville.

Dunn was born in Astoria, Long Island, the son of William R. Dunn, a ferry captain, and Martha Wentz. He had two brothers, Eddie and Stanley, who were also actors. He graduated from public schools there.

Dunn debuted as an actor in 1900 with the Corse Payton Stock Company in Brooklyn. He went on to perform in vaudeville.

He appeared along Mary Maurice, Earle Williams, James Morrison, Robert Gaillard, Tefft Johnson, Ralph Ince and Wallace Reid in The Seventh Son (1912), directed by Hal Reid; and along Evelyn Nesbitt, Russell Thaw, Henry Clive, Alphonse Ethier and Jane Jennings in I Want to Forget (1918), directed by James Kirkwood.

Dunn was married to Sabel Johnson, who performed in, and wrote for, vaudeville sketches. They had a son, William Welcome Dunn.

Filmography

References

External links

1888 births
1946 deaths
American male silent film actors
20th-century American male actors
Male actors from New York City
20th-century American male writers
Writers from New York City